Helen, Helena or Jelena of Serbia may refer to the following Serbian consorts:

 Helena of Serbia, Queen of Hungary (Jelena Vukanović), Queen consort of Hungary; Béla II of Hungary (1131–1141)
 Saint Helena of Serbia (Jelena Anžujska), Queen consort of Serbia; Stephen Uroš I of Serbia (1245–1276)
 Helena Doukaina Angelina, Queen consort of Serbia; Stefan Uroš II Milutin (1273–1284)
 Helena of Bulgaria, Empress of Serbia (Jelena), Empress consort of Serbia; Stephen Uroš IV Dušan of Serbia (1332–1355)
 Helena of Serbia, Princess of Zeta (Jelena), Princes consort of Zeta; Đurađ II Balšić of Zeta (1385–1403)
 Helena Gattilusio, Despotitsa consort of Serbia; Stefan Lazarević (1405–1427)
 Helena Palaiologina of Morea, Despotitsa consort of Serbia; Lazar Branković (1456–1458)
 Maria of Serbia, Queen of Bosnia (christened Jelena), Queen consort of Bosnia; Stephen Tomašević (1461–1463)
 Princess Helena of Serbia (Jelena Karađorđević), Princess consort of Russia; Prince John Constantinovich of Russia (lived 1886–1918)
 Helena Dragaš of the House of Dejanović

See also
 Helena of Bulgaria (disambiguation)
 Anna of Serbia (disambiguation)
 Maria of Serbia (disambiguation)
 Queen Jelena (disambiguation)

Serbian royalty